The Alexander River is a river in the Goldfields-Esperance region of Western Australia.

The river was named in 1870 by John Forrest, who was surveying the area at the time. He named the river after his brother, Alexander Forrest, who was also a surveyor and who later became the Lord Mayor of Perth, Western Australia.

References

Rivers of the Goldfields-Esperance region